Ralph Stewart may refer to:

 Ralph Stewart (ice hockey) (born 1948), ice hockey player
 Ralph Stewart (Canadian politician) (1929–2004), Canadian politician, member of the House of Commons
 Ralph Randles Stewart (1890–1993), botanist
 Ralph Stewart (American football) (1925–2016), American football player and coach